The Cock of The North was a golf tournament held in Zambia.  It was part of the Sunshine Tour in 2000 and 2001. The tournament was founded in 1954 and was held at the Ndola Golf Club in Ndola.

Founded in 1954, the tournament was held annually until 1977, when the European Tournament Players Division took over running of the Safari Circuit. It was then only held every other year, alternating on the schedule with the Mufulira Open, until 1985, although it was incorporated with the Zambia Open in 1977 and 1979, and not held in 1983. The tournament was revived in 2000 as part of the Sunshine Tour, before being cancelled in 2002 due to lack of sponsorship.

Note: The records from the Ndola Golf Club show that Craig Defoy, Sam Torrance, Tommy Horton, and Brian Barnes won the tournament in 1972, 1975, 1977, and 1979 respectively. However, in those years the Zambia Open was held at the Ndola Golf Club and there was no separate Cock o' the North tournament.

Winners

References

External links
Ndola Golf Club history

Former Sunshine Tour events
Safari Circuit events
Golf tournaments in Zambia
Recurring sporting events established in 1954
Recurring sporting events disestablished in 2001
1954 establishments in Northern Rhodesia
2001 disestablishments in Zambia